Alberni-Qualicum was a provincial electoral district for the Legislative Assembly of British Columbia, Canada from 2001 to 2009.

Demographics

Geography

1999 redistribution
The changes from Alberni to Alberni-Qualicum include:
Inclusion of Qualicum and other areas to the east

History 
The riding was represented by Scott Fraser of the British Columbia New Democratic Party from 2005 to 2009.  Prior to that, the seat was held by Gillian Trumper of the Liberal Party of British Columbia from 2001 to 2005.

Election results

External links 
BC Stats Profile - 2001 (pdf)
Results of 2001 election (pdf)
2001 Expenditures (pdf)
Website of the Legislative Assembly of British Columbia

Former provincial electoral districts of British Columbia on Vancouver Island
Port Alberni